Shatin Baptist Church  is a Baptist Evangelical multi-site megachurch, affiliated with the Baptist Convention of Hong Kong, headquartered in Sha Tin in Hong Kong's New Territories.

History
The church was founded in 1962.In 1977, it inaugurated its main building. 

Shatin Baptist Church runs a few activities such as L.O.S.T, Children Christendom and hosts the 279th division of the Boys' Brigade.

The Church organisation has campuses in Jordan, Lek Yuen, Siu Lek Yuen, Sha Tin Wai and Ma On Shan.

References

External links

 Official Website of the Shatin Baptist Church

Sha Tin
Evangelical megachurches in Hong Kong
1977 establishments in Hong Kong
Baptist churches in Hong Kong
Baptist multisite churches